The Society of Janus is the second BDSM organization founded in the United States (after The Eulenspiegel Society) and is a San Francisco, California based BDSM education and support group.

The Society of Janus is nonprofit, volunteer run and is devoted to the art of safe, consensual and non-exploitative adult power exchange. They publish a monthly digital newsletter called Yellow.

History
The Society of Janus was founded in August 1974 by Cynthia Slater and Larry Olsen. According to the Leather Hall of Fame biography of Slater, she said of the Society of Janus:

A group called Cardea, a women's discussion group within the Society of Janus, existed from 1977 to 1978 before discontinuing. A core of lesbian members of Cardea, including Pat Califia, who identified as a lesbian at the time, Gayle Rubin, and sixteen others, were inspired to start Samois on June 13, 1978, as an exclusively lesbian BDSM group. Samois was a lesbian-feminist BDSM organization based in San Francisco that existed from 1978 to 1983, and was the first lesbian BDSM group in the United States. 

The Society of Janus was one of the founding coalition partners of the National Coalition for Sexual Freedom, which was founded in 1997.

In 2004, the Society of Janus Hall of Fame was established. Some of its inductees are: Guy Baldwin, Patrick Califia, Dossie Easton, Janet Hardy, Viola Johnson, Midori, Fakir Musafar, Charles Moser, Gayle Rubin, Cynthia Slater, Jim Ward, Mollena Williams-Haas, and Jay Wiseman.

In 2014, the Society of Janus held their 40th Anniversary Dinner, Hall of Fame Induction Ceremony & Play Party, which was awarded "Best Organization Anniversary Event" at The SF Leather Community Awards for that year. 

In 2017, the art installation known as the San Francisco South of Market Leather History Alley was installed; in it Society of Janus cofounder Cynthia Slater is honored with a metal bootprint displaying her name and a short statement about her.

In 2018, the Society of Janus was inducted into the Leather Hall of Fame.

See also 
 Leather Pride flag
 National Coalition for Sexual Freedom

References

Further reading
 Society of Janus: 25 Years, 1999, copyright T. Weymouth and Society of Janus

External links 
 

Society of Janus, The
Sexuality in San Francisco
Non-profit organizations based in San Francisco
Organizations established in 1974
1974 establishments in California